Chefs is a French drama television series that aired on France 2 (France) in 2015-16.

Plot 
Every year Le Chef (English: The Chef), owner of the restaurant Le Paris, and a figure in French cuisine incorporates a young offender on probation into his team. Romain, just released from prison, arrives in this new world where gastronomy and excellence mix. After a difficult integration, he shows a real talent for cooking and climbs the ranks.

Characters
 Clovis Cornillac : Le Chef
 Hugo Becker : Romain
 Nicolas Gob : Yann
 Joyce Bibring : Charlène
 Zinedine Soualem : Karim
 Annie Cordy : Léonie (Season 1)
 Juliette Noureddine : Angélique (Season 1)
 Robin Renucci : Monsieur Edouard
 Anne Charrier : Delphine
 Étienne Chicot : Walter
 Philippe Nahon : Marcel (Season 2)
 Agustín Galiana : Esteban (2 Episodes)
 Jean Bediebe : Souleimane
 Max Morel : Lucien
 Anthony Pho : Woo
 Laurent Ménoret : JC
 Myriam Boyer : Mother Guy (Season 2)
 Philippe Laudenbach : The Grand Master of the Circle (Season 2)
 Laura Malvarosa : Romain'mother
 Jean-Louis Sbille : The notary (1 episode)
 Kait Tenison : Madame Bogrov (1 Episode)
 Stéphane Boucher : Robert (1 Episode)

Awards 
The series received the Best Series Award, the People's Choice Award for a TV Series and the Most Promising Actors for Hugo Becker  at the 2015 Festival des créations télévisuelles de Luchon.

Ratings 

Légende :
Green : highest
Red : lowest

References

External links

2015 French television series debuts
France 2
France Télévisions television dramas
2010s French drama television series
2016 French television series endings